Desmond Piper (born 11 October 1941) is an Australian former field hockey player who competed in the 1964 Summer Olympics, in the 1968 Summer Olympics, and in the 1972 Summer Olympics.

References

External links
 

1941 births
Living people
Australian male field hockey players
Olympic field hockey players of Australia
Field hockey players at the 1964 Summer Olympics
Field hockey players at the 1968 Summer Olympics
Field hockey players at the 1972 Summer Olympics
Olympic silver medalists for Australia
Olympic bronze medalists for Australia
Olympic medalists in field hockey
Medalists at the 1968 Summer Olympics
Medalists at the 1964 Summer Olympics
Field hockey players from Melbourne
Sportsmen from Victoria (Australia)